Sambrook is a small village in the ceremonial county of Shropshire, where it is part of the civil parish of Chetwynd, north of the town of Newport. To the north is the small hamlet of Ellerton, with Howle to the west and Pickstock to the south-east.

It was recorded as a manor in the Domesday book survey, when it was known as "Semembre"; the spellings "Sambroc" and "Sambrock" were later used: the name probably means "sand brook".

In the village there is an early 18th-century manor house, Sambrook Manor, a public house, the Three Horseshoes, and a mill with a large millpond fed by the Goldstone and Waggs Brooks. The 19th-century village church, St Luke's, was designed by Benjamin Ferrey.

There is another mill, the derelict but Grade II Listed 18th-century Showell Mill, a short distance to the south-east.

See also
Listed buildings in Chetwynd, Shropshire

References

Villages in Shropshire